King Xiao of Yan (died 255 BC), ancestral name Jī (姬), clan name Yān (燕), personal name unknown, was the seventh king of the state of Yan in Warring States period of Chinese history. He ruled the kingdom between 257 BC until his death in 255 BC.

King Xiao was a son of King Wucheng of Yan, he ascended the throne after his father's death. During his reign, Yan started to construct an extensive fortifications to protect against the barbarians. The wall stretched from Shanggu Commandery to Liaodong Commandery.

King Xiao died in 255 BC, succeeded by his son Xi.

See also
Gojoseon–Yan War

References

Monarchs of Yan (state)
250s BC deaths
Chinese kings
Year of birth unknown
3rd-century BC Chinese monarchs